North Dorset RFC is a rugby union club in Gillingham, Dorset, who have been in existence since 1951. They currently play in Southern Counties South and are based at Slaughtergate, Gillingham. The club runs three senior teams and a veterans side, the junior section starts at Under 7's up to a Colts XV.

Dorset and Wilts Cup

North Dorset won the Dorset & Wilts cup once in their history
2015/2016 season beating Marlborough 17 - 16 at Salisbury

Dorset and Wilts Vase
North Dorset have won the vase 4 times in recent years.

2002/2003 season beating Westbury in the final.

2004/2005 season beating Swindon 27-25 in the final.

2008/2009 Season beating Devizes 24-7 in the final.

2009/2010 Season beating Corsham 31-16 in the final.

They were runners up in the 2006/2007 & 2011/2012 losing both times to Wootton Bassett

In 2010/2011 the club once again got to the final but the game was never played due to Wootton Bassett RFC not wanting to play the game due to their aim to finish 2nd and qualify for the promotion play off, they finished 3rd.

Off the Field
The club have had some remarkable success being awarded or winning:

2006 RFU Seal of Approval.

2008 Best Cutting Edge School Club link by a School/Club.

2009 Rugby Football Union President's XV award., Mini and Youth Seal of Approval Club of the Year .

They were also runners up Mini and Youth Seal of Approval Club of the Year in 2007 and 2008.

Club Honours

1st Team:
Dorset & Wilts 2 South champions (2): 1988–89, 2002–03
Dorset & Wilts Vase champions (4): 2003, 2005, 2009, 2010
Southern Counties South champions: 2011-12
Southern Counties Cup champions: 2015-16
Dorset & Wilts Cup champions: 2015-16
Dorset & Wilts 1 South champions: 2021-22

2nd Team:
Dorset & Wilts 2nd XV Cup champions: 2012-13

3rd Team:
Dorset & Wilts 3 South champions (2): 2005-06, 2017–18

Touring Team:
 Ghent 15s rugby festival champions: 2009.

Notes

References

External links
The official site

English rugby union teams
Gillingham, Dorset
Rugby union in Dorset